North Carolina's 47th Senate district is one of 50 districts in the North Carolina Senate. It has been represented by Republican Ralph Hise since 2011.

Geography
Since 2013, the district has covered all of Madison, Yancey, Mitchell, McDowell, Rutherford, and Polk counties. The district overlaps with the 85th, 87th, 93rd, and 118th state house districts.

District officeholders since 2003

Election results

2022

2020

2018

2016

2014

2012

2010

2008

2006

2004

2002

References

North Carolina Senate districts
Haywood County, North Carolina
Madison County, North Carolina
Yancey County, North Carolina
Mitchell County, North Carolina
Avery County, North Carolina
Caldwell County, North Carolina
Watauga County, North Carolina
Ashe County, North Carolina
Alleghany County, North Carolina